Sigehard or Sieghard (died on 12 August 1077) was patriarch of Aquileia from 1068 to 1077. He was the member of a Bavarian noble family with estates in Chiemgau.

Sigehard remained faithful to Henry IV during the investiture controversy between the Popes and the Holy Roman Emperors. For his loyalty, Henry rewarded Sigehard with the investiture of the Friulan county on 3 April 1077. Struck with a sudden illness, the patriarch died in Ulm a few months after.

With Sigehard the Patriarchs of Aquileia became the direct vassals of the Emperors; their power now extended over a territory which was subject only to their jurisdiction. The territory then constituted an ecclesiastical and political "imperial and Italian principality" (Patriarchal State of Aquileia).

References

Sources

1077 deaths
Patriarchs of Aquileia
Investiture Controversy